Amy Burk née Kneebone (born 17 March 1990) is a Canadian goalball player who competes in international level events. She is a three time Parapan American Games bronze medalist and double World champion.

References

External links
 
 

1990 births
Living people
People with albinism
Sportspeople from Charlottetown
Paralympic goalball players of Canada
Goalball players at the 2008 Summer Paralympics
Goalball players at the 2012 Summer Paralympics
Goalball players at the 2016 Summer Paralympics
Medalists at the 2011 Parapan American Games
Medalists at the 2015 Parapan American Games
Medalists at the 2019 Parapan American Games
Goalball players at the 2020 Summer Paralympics